The Atatürk Monument is a Turkish monument dedicated to Mustafa Kemal Atatürk, the founder of modern Turkey, located at the Ankara Campus of the Faculty of Arts and Sciences in Middle East Technical University (METU). The competition for the monument started in 1965, in which Şadi Çalık came in first place. Çalık completed the monument in 1966. The bronze monument is Turkey's first abstract monument dedicated to Atatürk.

On November 10, 2016, the death day of Atatürk, a commemoration was held by METU staff and students in front of the monument

References 

Bronze sculptures in Turkey
1966 sculptures
Abstract sculptures in Turkey
Monuments and memorials in Ankara
Monuments and memorials to Mustafa Kemal Atatürk in Turkey
Middle East Technical University